Marc Butan is an American film producer and CEO at MadRiver Pictures, a Santa Monica, California-based motion picture production company.

During his career, he has served as co-president at Sierra/Affinity, president at Panorama Media, president at 2929 Productions and executive vice president of production at Lionsgate, where he was responsible for overseeing film production for the studio. Butan was previously an investment banker at Kidder, Peabody & Co. and Prudential Financial.

In 2015, he founded MadRiver Pictures to produce star-driven commercial feature films.  Since inception, the company has produced James Gray's The Lost City of Z starring Charlie Hunnam; Burr Steers' Pride and Prejudice and Zombies; Triple 9 starring Casey Affleck, Chiwetel Ejiofor, Kate Winslet and Woody Harrelson; Mark Felt: The Man Who Brought Down the White House starring Liam Neeson and most recently James Gray's Ad Astra starring Brad Pitt.

In 2016, MadRiver Pictures and Vincent Maraval's Insiders joined forces to form an international film sales joint venture, IMR international. In 2021, IMR rebranded to The Veterans.

Butan is a native of Dayton, Ohio and an alumnus of Ohio State University, where he became a member of Phi Kappa Tau.

Filmography
He was a producer in all films unless otherwise noted.

Film

Thanks

References

External links
 

Businesspeople from Dayton, Ohio
Film producers from Ohio
Ohio State University alumni
Living people
Year of birth missing (living people)
American chief executives